is a Japanese former baseball player.

He played in the Western League for the Carp's affiliate team from 2014 to 2021. Kuwahara made his first-team debut on September 5, 2020, against the Yokohama DeNA BayStars. During the 2020 season, he played in three total games with the first-team, recording three at-bats and no hits.

On November 3, 2021, the Carp announced Kuwahara's release from the organization.

References

Baseball people from Shizuoka Prefecture
Living people
1996 births
Nippon Professional Baseball infielders
Hiroshima Toyo Carp players